Lazuri may refer to:

Language
Laz language

Places
Lazuri, Satu Mare, a commune in Satu Mare County, Romania
Lazuri, a village in Lupșa Commune, Alba County, Romania
Lazuri, a village in Sohodol Commune, Alba County, Romania
Lazuri, a village in Vârfurile Commune, Arad County, Romania
Lazuri, a village in Roșia, Bihor Commune, Bihor County, Romania
Lazuri, a village in Comișani Commune, Dâmboviţa County, Romania
Lazuri, a village in Scoarța Commune, Gorj County, Romania
Lazuri, a village in Valcău de Jos Commune, Sălaj County, Romania
Lazuri de Beiuș, a commune in Bihor County, Romania

Other uses
Laz people
Laz language
Lazuri (swimming)